Olindo Iacobelli (born 17 October 1945) is a retired Italian racing driver.

References

1945 births
Living people
French racing drivers
24 Hours of Le Mans drivers
IMSA GT Championship drivers
World Sportscar Championship drivers
Place of birth missing (living people)
20th-century French people